Warrant Officer of the Air Force (WOFF-AF) is the senior Warrant Officer in the Royal Australian Air Force (RAAF). It is a singular appointment, being it is only held by one person at any time. The special insignia for the WOFF-AF is the Australian Coat of Arms encircled by a wreath of Australian native flora. The current Warrant Officer of the Air Force is Ralph Clifton.

Similar to the United States Air Force practice of appointing a Chief Master Sergeant of the Air Force, the WOFF-AF is responsible to the Chief of Air Force (CAF). The post was created by the then Chief of the Air Staff, Air Marshal Barry Gration, in 1993 to provide a conduit between Air Force's senior leadership and the airman ranks.

The WOFF-AF is head of the Royal Australian Air Force's Senior Enlisted Leadership Team (SELT). The SELT comprises all Tier C and Tier B Warrant Officers (E-9) in the Air Force. The members of the SELT have the responsibility of providing support to command, support to the workforce, and welfare for all. The SELT comprises Air Force Warrant Officers selected for Tier progression by CAF to perform the roles of Warrant Officer of the Air Force, Air Force Headquarters and RAAF Air Command Warrant Officers, along with Group, Wing or Base Warrant Officer positions located within Air Force. Tier Warrant Officer positions provide the Warrant Officers with direct contact to Commanders, Executive Staff as well as Senior Officers and Airmen.

The SELT participate in open discussion forums designed to look at issues facing Air Force and enlisted personnel now and in the future. This enables a shared understanding of matters affecting Air Force and enlisted personnel across the whole Force, and where appropriate the Australian Defence Force (ADF). With the SELT geographically dispersed across the country, it is important that there is a common understanding of the issues in Air Force, ADF and with enlisted personnel.
 
Under the leadership of the WOFF-AF, the SELT continuously look within themselves to ensure they are developing core behaviours as a team to support a culture of Inclusive Leadership. Within the Australian Defence Force, the Air Force contributes highly skilled and agile senior enlisted leaders to undertake key appointments in the Joint environment, in both strategic and operational roles.

Since 2017, upon appointment to the position of WOFF-AF, E-9 Warrant Officers are promoted to the Enlisted Rank of E-10. 

The WOFF-AF appointment is an equal peer to the Regimental Sergeant Major of the Army (RSM-A) in the Australian Army and Warrant Officer of the Navy (WO-N) in the Royal Australian Navy.

Appointees

Warrant Officer of the Air Force Ensign Raising Ceremony

Each year on 31 March, at a dawn ceremony on the banks of Lake Burley Griffin at Regatta Point in Australia's capital city of Canberra, the WOFF-AF has the esteemed honour of performing the salute on behalf of all Australian Airmen, as the Royal Australian Air Force Ensign is raised to mark the anniversary of the formation of the Royal Australian Air Force in 1921. The Ensign is hoisted aloft the 40 metre high Canadian Flag Pole by Australia's Federation Guard and flown for the day. The Ensign flying in the National Capital serves as a symbol of the respect the people of Australia hold for the service and sacrifice of the Royal Australian Air Force to the Nation, in times of both war and peace.

Warrant Officer of the Air Force Badges and Insignia of Office
The WOFF-AF undertakes the role of Reviewing Officer at Air Force ceremonial events, such as the graduation parades of enlistees from No 1 Recruit Training Unit (1RTU) at RAAF Base Wagga, and other Air Force or Joint training establishments. On such occasions, the WOFF-AF Pennant is flown.

Airmen's Code
The WOFF-AF is the Royal Australian Air Force's custodian of the Airmen's Code.

References

External links
 Warrant Officer of the Air Force
 ADF Pay & Conditions Manual - Equivalent ranks and classifications

Royal Australian Air Force
Military appointments of Australia
Warrant officers